Sphenomorphus tropidonotus is a species of skink found in Indonesia.

References

tropidonotus
Taxa named by George Albert Boulenger
Reptiles described in 1897
Reptiles of Sulawesi